Swaroopganj (Swarupganj) is a village in Sirohi district in Rajasthan state in India.  It is located about 45 km south of Sirohi and 20 km north of Abu Road.  Swaroopganj (Swarupganj)is a railway station on Ahmedabad-Jaipur rail route.

References 

Villages in Sirohi district